The 1974 FIM Motocross World Championship was the 18th FIM Motocross Racing World Championship season.

Summary
Heikki Mikkola claimed his first 500cc world championship in a season-long battle with three-time world champion Roger De Coster that wasn't decided until the final Grand Prix of the season. The 250cc world championship ended in controversy as Russian riders used questionable riding tactics to secure the championship for Guennady Moisseev over Jaroslav Falta.

500cc Class
Mikkola and De Coster dominated the series winning 17 of the 22 races as they competed for the premier division in motocross racing. Suzuki hired former privateer, Gerrit Wolsink to be De Coster's teammate. Former world champion, Bengt Åberg, left Husqvarna to join the Bultaco factory racing team. Brad Lackey replaced the departed Åberg, joining Mikkola and Arne Kring on the Husqvarna team while, Christer Hammargren replaced Lackey on the Kawasaki team.

The season began at the Austrian Grand Prix where Husqvarna's Mikkola won both races while De Coster's Suzuki had engine problems in the first race then suffered a flat tire in the second moto. Mikkola continued his winning streak with two more victories at the French Grand Prix, relegating De Coster to second in both races. Mikkola won a fifth consecutive moto at the Danish Grand Prix while De Coster retired with a loose exhaust pipe. De Coster finally scored his first moto win with a second moto victory in Denmark, holding Mikkola to second place. In the Czechoslovakian Grand Prix, Mikkola took a victory in the first race and, was leading the second race when it began to rain causing him to crash three times, allowing De Coster to take the victory. At the halfway point of the season, Mikkola and De Coster had accounted for all of the race wins with Mikkola winning 7 motos to De Coster's 3 wins.

At the German Grand Prix, Mikkola injured his ribs during practice and missed the race, allowing Maico rider, Adolf Weil to finally break the monopoly with a win in the first race at his home Grand Prix while De Coster finished in fourth place. A malfunctioning front brake caused De Coster to crash in the second race while his Suzuki teammate, Gerrit Wolsink took the win. Three weeks later at the British Grand Prix, Mikkola was back in action however, a bent brake pedal in a first turn crash forced him out of the race. De Coster was leading the race when his rear suspension broke and led to his retirement, allowing Yamaha rider Jaak van Velthoven to claim the victory. De Coster came back to win the second race while Mikkola once again was involved in a first turn crash with Weil putting him in last place. In a display of determination, Mikkola fought his way through the pack and into third place after 10 laps. 

The series then crossed the Atlantic for the United States Grand Prix with Mikkola holding a 25-point lead in the standings. De Coster had suffered mechanical breakdowns while leading five races. In the first moto, Wolsink held the lead before allowing his teammate De Coster to pass him and collect maximum championship points three laps from the finish. Mikkola rode the last four laps with a flat tire to salvage a fourth-place finish. De Coster was hindered by a damaged front wheel hub in the second race while his teammate Wolsink barely held off a charging Mikkola to win the race by a one-foot margin and deny Mikkola valuable championship points. An exhausted Wolsink collapsed from his bike immediately after crossing the finish line.

Back in Europe for the Dutch Grand Prix, Mikkola and De Coster traded moto wins in the exhausting deep, sand track at Markelo. Going into the final two events of the season, Mikkola held a 10-point lead meaning that De Coster would have to win three of the last four motos to secure his fourth consecutive 500cc world championship. The setting of the Belgian Grand Prix was a rugged, narrow track in the forests surrounding the picturesque hilltop Citadel of Namur. First held in 1947, the Namur circuit was known as the Monaco of the motocross grand prix circuit in reference to the prestigious Formula One race. Wolsink took the lead at the start of the first race while Mikkola and De Coster battled their way to the front of the pack. When Wolsink's engine seized, the two series points leaders once again found themselves first and second with Mikkola holding on to the lead to the end of the race. De Coster had to win the final three races to overtake Mikkola for the championship. Wolsink once again grabbed the early lead in the second race but, soon crashed allowing De Coster into the lead with Mikkola in second place. De Coster continued to widen his lead to win the second moto to extend the championship points battle to the final race of the season in Luxembourg. In the first race, De Coster worked his way through the pack to take the lead before his Suzuki suffered an engine problem forcing him out of the race. Mikkola took over the lead and won the race to clinch his first world championship.

250cc Class
The 250cc championship was a battle between Soviet KTM rider Guennady Moisseev and Czech ČZ rider Jaroslav Falta which ended in controversy at the final race of the season. Moisseev won the first moto and took the overall victory at the season opening Spanish Grand Prix. Falta won both races at the Italian Grand Prix followed with a win in the first moto of his home Grand Prix in Czechoslovakia but, then suffered two breakdowns in Poland while Moisseev won both races. Falta won a moto in Yugoslavia and at the halfway point of the season, he trailed the Russian rider by 20 points. Each rider took a second place at the West German Grand Prix but, Falta won a moto at the Dutch Grand Prix to close the points gap to 5 points going into the final race of the season in Switzerland.

Falta took the lead in the first race and appeared to be heading for victory while Moisseev was being slowed by a rear suspension failure. When Falta came upon the slowing Russian rider and tried to pass him, the KTM rider made an attempt to obstruct him allowing second and third place riders, Harry Everts and Håkan Andersson to catch up. When Falta attempted to pass Moisseev, the Russian rider collided with him causing him to fall off his bike. Falta was quickly able to remount but, finished the race in third place. Falta had to win the final moto to have any chance to claim the world championship. As the race began, Falta once again jumped into the lead while Moisseev was forced to retire on the seventh lap. When Falta came upon two Russian riders, Victor Popenko and Eugeny Rybaltchenko, they appeared to attempt to block him. As Falta tried to pass them, Rybaltchenko rode into him, knocking him down. He remounted in third place as race officials waved the black flag at the two Russian riders, disqualifying them from the race. Falta was able to catch up and pass Everts and Gaston Rahier to recapture the lead and win the race, apparently clinching the world championship. However two hours after the conclusion of the race, jury officials penalized Falta one minute for jumping the start which dropped him to eighth place handing the world championship to Moisseev.

Grands Prix

500cc

250cc

Final standings

500cc

Points are awarded to the top 10 classified finishers.

250cc

Points are awarded to the top 10 classified finishers.

See also
 1974 AMA Motocross National Championship season
 1974 Trans-AMA motocross series

References

External links
 

FIM Motocross World Championship season
Motocross World Championship seasons